Rybachenko is a surname of Ukrainian origin. It is a patronymic derivation  from surname/nickname Rybak, the latter literally meaning "fisherman".

Notable people with this surname include:

Anastasia Rybachenko
 Mikhail Rybachenko, a boy whose murder inspired the Kishinev pogrom of Jews in 1903

Ukrainian-language surnames
Occupational surnames
Patronymic surnames